This is a list of acronyms found in the context of energy issues.

A 
AAQS—Ambient Air Quality Standards (environment) (US)
AAU—Assigned amount units (measurement)
ABT—Availability based tariff (electricity)
ABF—Aquatic Base Flow (Hydropower) (electricity)
AC—Alternating current
ACA—Annual Charge Adjustment (electricity)
ACE—Area Control Error (electricity)
ACEEE—American Council for an Energy-Efficient Economy
ACRS—Accelerated Cost Recovery System (finance)
ADITC—Accumulated Deferred Investment Tax Credit (policy)
ADR—Asset Depreciation Range (finance)
AEP—American Electric Power (electricity)
AESO—Alberta Electric System Operator
AFE—Authority for Expenditure or Authorization for Expenditure
AFUDC—allowance for funds used during construction
AFV—Alternative fuel vehicle
AGA—American Gas Association
AGC—Automatic generation control
AGD—Associated Gas Distributors (US)
AIEE—American Institute of Electrical Engineers
AIMA—Agricultural Impact Mitigation Agreement (US)
ALJ—Administrative law judge
AMBO—Armenia, Macedonia, Bulgaria Oil pipeline
AMI—Advanced metering infrastructure
AMR—Automated meter reading also known as Automatic Meter Reading
AMRA—Automatic Meter Reading Association
ANGTA—Alaskan Natural Gas Transportation Act of 1977 to build the Alaska gas pipeline
ANGTS—Alaskan Natural Gas Transportation System
ANSI—American National Standards Institute
AOS—Authorized Overrun Service
APA—Administrative Procedure Act
—Alaska Power Administration
APE—Area of potential effect (electricity)
API—American Petroleum Institute (oil)
APPA—American Public Power Association (electricity)
APR—Actual peak reduction (e.g. in demand response systems) (electricity)
AQCR—Air Quality Control Region (US) (environment)
ARA—(in shipping) ports of Amsterdam – Rotterdam – Antwerp (oil)
ARR—Auction Revenue Rights (electricity)
ASCC—Alaskan System Coordination Council
ASE—Alliance to Save Energy
ASTM—American Society for Testing and Materials
ATC—Available transfer capability
AVR—Automatic Voltage Regulator (electricity)

B 
BA—Balancing Authority
BA—Biological Assessment
BACT—Best Available Control Technology
BBL/D—Barrel per day
BBL/SD—Barrel per day, on stream days
BBL—barrel (42 gallons)
—Balgzand Bacton Line (BBL Pipeline)
BCD—Barrel per day, on calendar days
BCF—billion cubic feet
BCP—Blackstart Capability Plan
BES—Bulk electric system (Electricity transmission)
BfP—Bureau Fédéral du Plan (Belgium). (Has responsibilities over economic, social and environmental policy
bhp—Brake horsepower 
BIA—Bureau of Indian Affairs (US)
BIPV—Building Integrated Photo Voltaic
bl—Barrel
BLM—Bureau of Land Management of United States Department of the Interior
BLS—Bureau of Labor Statistics of United States Department of Labor
BOE—Barrel of oil equivalent (international)
BPA—Bonneville Power Administration (US)
BPL—Broadband over power line
BPS—Bulk Power System (Electricity transmission)
BTMG—Behind The Meter Generation
BTU—British thermal unit(s)
BTX—from BTX process, a mixture of benzene, toluene, and xylene (oil)
BuRec—United States Bureau of Reclamation (government)
BWR—Boiling water reactor (nuclear)

C 
C&I—Commercial and industrial customers (Electricity transmission)
CA—Carbon Abatement- increasing carbon-neutrality
—Control area (EU) – The portion of the generation and transmission system controlled by a single transmission system operator. (See also TSO).
CAA—Clean Air Act (US)
CAEM—Center for the Advancement of Energy Markets (US)
CAES—Compressed Air Energy Storage
CAFE—Corporate Average Fuel Economy standards (US)
CAISO—California Independent System Operator Corporation, a regional transmission organization. (US)
CAP—Capacity market programs
—Climate Action Plan
CAPM—Capital asset pricing model
CARB—California Air Resources Board
CBL—Customer Baseline Load
CBM—Capacity Benefit Margin
CBOB—Conventional Gasoline Blendstock for Oxygenate Blending (Motor Gasoline Blending Component)
CC—Combined cycle see also CCPP and CCGT
CCGT—Combined cycle gas turbine electricity generator
CCLIP—Conditional Credit Line for Investment Projects
CCN—Certificate of Convenience and Necessity (utilities regulation)
CCPG—Colorado Coordinated Planning Group
CCPP—Combined cycle power plant
CD—Contract Demand
CDD—Cooling degree day, a qualitative index used to reflect the demand for energy to cool a business
CDM—Clean Development Mechanism
CEA—Country Environmental Analysis
CEC—California Energy Commission
—Commission for Environmental Cooperation
—Council of the European Communities
CEEC—Central and Eastern European Countries
CEMS—Continuous emissions monitoring system
CEP—Country Environmental Profile
—Clean Energy Partnership, a joint hydrogen-project in Europe.
CEPS—Centre for European Policy Studies
CEPII—Centre d'Etudes Prospectives et d'Informations Internationales Economics think tank
CEQ—Council on Environmental Quality
CER—Certified Emission Reduction
CERA—Cambridge Energy Research Associates
CERCLA—Comprehensive Environmental Response, Compensation, and Liability Act "Superfund" (US)
CERCLIS—Comprehensive Environmental Response, Compensation, and Liability Information System (US)
CERTS—Consortium for Electric Reliability Technology Solutions sponsored by the United States Department of Energy and California Energy Commission (US)
CfD—Contract for difference
CFS—cubic feet per second
CFTC—Commodity Futures Trading Commission
CH4—Methane
CHP—Combined heat and power
CIAC—Contributions in Aid of Construction
CIP—Critical Infrastructure Protection (US)
—see also EPCIP European Programme for Critical Infrastructure Protection
CMVE—Competitive Market Value Estimate
CNG—Compressed natural gas
CO—Carbon monoxide
CO2—Carbon dioxide
COC—Cost of capital
COE—U.S. Army Corps of Engineers
CP—Coincident Peak
—Certificate Proceeding
CPA—California Power Authority
CPI—Consumer Price Index
CPP—Critical Peak Pricing
CPP-F—Critical peak fixed
CPP-F—Critical peak variable
CPS—Control Performance Standard
—Cycles per second (hertz)
CPUC—California Public Utilities Commission
CREF—Caribbean Renewable Energy Facility
CRP—Conservation Reserve Program (US)
CRT—Capacity Reservation Tariff
CSD—Commission for Sustainable Development (UN)
CSEM—Center for the Study of Energy Markets (US)
CSP—Country Strategy Paper
—Curtailment service provider
CT—Combustion turbine (electricity)
CZMA—Coastal Zone Management Act

D 
DADRP—Day Ahead Demand Response Program
DADS-Demand response Availability Data System
DANIDA—Danish International Development Agency
DA-RTP—RTP Day ahead real time pricing (regarding Electricity metering)
DC—Direct current
DCLM—Direct control load management
DCS—Disturbance Control Standard
DEFG—Distributed Energy Financial Group (US)
DEIS—Draft Environmental Impact Statement (US)
DER—Distributed Energy Resources
DERMS—Distributed Energy Resource Management Systems
DF—Distribution Factor
DG—Distributed generation (electricity)
—Directorate-General (EU) (government)
DIIS—Danish Institute for International Studies (organization)
DLC—Direct load control (regarding Load management)
DME—Disturbance Monitoring Equipment
DO—Dissolved oxygen
DoD—Depth of discharge, energy drawn from a battery
DOE—United States Department of Energy (government)
DOE/FE—United States Department of Energy Office of Fossil Energy (government)
DOI—United States Department of the Interior (government)
DOT—United States Department of Transportation (government)
DP—Distribution point
DR—Demand response
DRAM—Demand Response and Advanced Metering Coalition
DRB—Demonstrated reserve base
DRCC—Demand Response Coordinating Council (coalition)
DRR—Demand Response resources
DRRC—Demand Response Research Center (California)
DSM—Demand side management
DSO—Distribution system operator (regarding electricity distribution)
Dth—Dekatherm (defined as  British thermal units, also written "MMBtu") (measurement)
DTW—dealer tank wagon (as in, "oil companies setting regional dealer tank wagon pricing") (Oil)

E 
E&D—Exploration and development expenses
E85—E85 fuel: A fuel containing a mixture of 85 percent ethanol and 15 percent gasoline
E95—like E85 fuel but with less gasoline. A fuel containing a mixture of 95 percent ethanol and 5 percent gasoline
EA—Environmental assessment as in an Environmental impact assessment
EAR—Estimated additional resources, as in considering reserves of uranium deposits
EC—European Commission
ECAR—East Central Area Reliability Coordination Agreement (US)
EPCIP—European Programme for Critical Infrastructure Protection
ECPA—Electric Consumers Protection Act (US)
EDC—Electric Distribution Company (electricity)
EdF—Electricité de France
EDRP—Emergency demand response program
EE—Energy efficiency
EEI—Edison Electric Institute
—Energy Efficiency Index for European Union energy labels
EERS—Energy Efficiency Resource Standards
EF—Earth Fault
EHV—Extra high voltage
EIA—Energy Information Administration (US)
—Environmental impact assessment (international)
EIB—European Investment Bank
EIM—Energy Imbalance Market (electricity)
EIPP—Eastern Interconnection Phasor Project
EIS—Environmental Impact Statement (US)
ELCON—Electricity Consumers Resources Council
EMF—Electro magnetic field
EMP—Environmental Management Plan
EOR—Enhanced oil recovery
EPA—United States Environmental Protection Agency
EPAct—Energy Policy Act of 1992 (US)
—Energy Policy Act of 2005 (US)
EPRI—Electric Power Research Institute (US)
EPSA—Electric Power Supply Association
EQR—Electric Quarterly Report
ERA—Economic Regulatory Administration (part of United States Department of Energy
ERCOT—Electric Reliability Council of Texas, Inc, a regional transmission organization. (US)
ERGEG—European Regulators Group for Electricity and Gas
ERIS—Energy Resource Interconnection Service (electricity)
ERO—Electric Reliability Organization. The US designated NERC as its ERO.
ERoEI—Energy returned on energy invested
ERRA—Energy Regulators Regional Association
ESCO—Energy service company
ESI—Environmental Sustainability Index
ESMAP—Energy Sector Management Assistance Programme
ESP—Electrostatic precipitator
ESS—Energy Storage System, as in grid energy storage (electricity)
ETBE—ethyl tertiary butyl ether
ETSO—European Transmission System Operators association
EU—European Union
EUEF—European Union Energy Facility
EUEI—European Union Energy Initiative

F 
FAC—Fuel Adjustment Clause
FACTS—Flexible Alternating Current Transmission System
FASB—Financial Accounting Standards Board
FBR—fast breeder reactor
FCITC—First Contingency Incremental Transfer Capability
FEIS—Final Environmental impact statement (US)
FELCC—Firm Energy Load Carrying Capability
FERC—Federal Energy Regulatory Commission (U.S.)
FGD—Flue-gas desulfurization
FINESSE—Financing Energy Services for Small Scale Users
Fishway—Fish ladder
FLPMA—Federal Land Policy and Management Act (US)
FME—Free market economics
FONSI—Finding of no significant impact. See Environmental impact statement (US)
FPA—Federal Power Act (US)
FPC—Federal Power Commission (US)
FPS—Firm peaking service. See Peaking power plant
FRCC—Florida Reliability Coordinating Council (US)
FRS—Financial Reporting System
FT—Firm Transportation Service
FTC—Federal Trade Commission (US)
FTR—Firm Transmission Rights
—Financial Transmission Rights. See explanation in electricity markets.
FTS—Firm transportation service
FUA—The Fuel Use Act (US)
FUCO—Foreign Utility Company
FWPA—Federal Water Power Act (US)

G 
G&T—Generation and transmission utility cooperative (electricity)
GADS—Generating Availability Data System (electricity)
GAL—gallon (measurement)
GAO—Government Accountability Office (General Accounting Office) (US) (government)
GATT—General Agreement on Tariffs and Trade (government)
GDP—gross domestic product (economics)
GEF—Global Environmental Facility (environment)
Genco—Any company doing electricity generation (US) (electricity)
GFN—Global Footprint Network
GFSE—Global Forum on Sustainable Energy (organization)
GIC—Gross Inland (energy) Consumption (EU) (energy)
GHG—Greenhouse gas (climate)
GIA—Generator Interconnection Agreement (electricity)
GIC—Gas Inventory Charge (natural gas)
GISB—Gas Industry Standards Board (now NAESB) (US) (natural gas)
GLDF—Generator to Load Distribution Factor. See Load balancing (electricity)
Gm3—Billion cubic metres (measurement – gas)
GMO—Genetically modified organism
GMP—Green Mountain Power (US) (electricity)
GNP—gross national product (economics)
GNSED—Global Network for Sustainable Energy Development
GRI—Gas Research Institute (US) (natural gas)
GRC—General rate case (US) (regulatory)
GridCo—Any company running a transmission grid (electricity). Also known as a TransCo (US) (electricity)
GSF—Generator to Load Distribution Factor. See Load balancing (electricity)
GPE—gravitational potential energy
GSR—Gas Supply Realignment (natural gas)
Gt—Gigaton (1 billion tons) (measurement)
GTCC—Gas Turbine Combined Cycle (electricity)
GTI—Gas Technology Institute (US)
Gtoe—One billion tons of oil equivalent(EU) (measurement- oil)
GVEP—Global Village Energy Partnership (organization)
GVW—gross vehicle weight (transportation)
GW—Gigawatt (one billion watts) (measurement- elect)
GWE—Gigawatt of electric energy (measurement- elect)
GWh—Gigawatt hour (one billion watt hours) (measurement- elect)
GWP—global warming potential (climate)

H 
HCA—Host Control Area (electricity)
HDD—Heating degree days a qualitative index used to reflect the demand for energy to heat a business (conservation)
HERS—Home energy rating standard (conservation)
HHI—Herfindahl–Hirschman Index (markets)
HID—high intensity discharge (electricity)
hp—Horsepower (measurement)
HRSG—Heat recovery steam generation
HTGR—high temperature gas cooled reactor (nuclear)
HVAC—Heating, ventilation, and air conditioning (conservation)
—High voltage alternating current (electricity)
HVAR—Highly Valued Aquatic Resource
HVDC—High Voltage Direct Current

I 
I/C—Interruptible /Curtailable (electricity)
ICAP—Installed Capacity (electricity)
ICAP-SCR—Installed capacity special case resources (electricity)
ICCP—Inter-Control Center Communications Protocol (electricity)
ICE—Internal combustion engine (transportation)
ICT—Independent Coordinator of Transmission (US) (electricity)
—Information and Communication Technology
IDC—Interchange Distribution Calculator (electricity)
IEA—International Energy Agency (Paris)
IEM—Internal electricity market (electricity)
IEEE—Institute of Electrical and Electronics Engineers
IEPE—Institute of Energy Policy and Economics (France)
IER—Incremental Energy Rate
IET—International emission trading (policy)
IGCC—Integrated coal gasification combined cycle
IGIC—Interim gas inventory charge (natural gas)
IGSC—Interim gas supply charge (natural gas)
IGT—Institute of Gas Technology (natural gas)
IGU—International Gas Union (natural gas)
IHR—Incremental Heat Rate- plant monitoring (electricity)
IIASA—International Institute for Applied System Analysis
IJC—International Joint Commission
ILP—Integrated Licensing Process
INGAA—Interstate Natural Gas Association of America
IOS—Interconnected Operations Services (electricity)
IOU—Investor owned utility (electricity)
IPAA—Independent Petroleum Association of America (oil)
IPCC—Intergovernmental Panel on Climate Change (climate)
IPP—Independent Power Producer (electricity)
IPS/UPS—Integrated Power System/United Power System, consisting of Independent Power Systems of 12 countries bordering Russia and the Unified Power System of Russia
IRC—ISO / RTO Council (electricity)
IROL—Interconnection Reliability Operating Limit (electricity)
IRP—Integrated Resource Planning
IRR—Internal Rate of Return (finance)
ISO—Independent System Operator (US) (see also TSO) Responsible for grid management, but does not own assets. (electricity)
ISO-NE—Independent System Operator of New England, a regional transmission organization. (US) (electricity)
ISO—NE ISO New England, Inc. (electricity)
ISS—Interruptible Sales Service
IT—Interruptible Transportation is gas shipment via pipeline whose delivery may be interrupted in favor of "firm shipment" contracts if there is lack of capacity. (natural gas)
ITC—Investment tax credit (policy)
ITS—"Interruptible Transportation Service" is gas shipment via pipeline whose delivery may be interrupted in favor of "firm shipment" contracts if there is lack of capacity. (natural gas)

J 
JRC—Joint Research Centre
JREC—Johannesburg Renewable Energy Coalition

K 
koe—One kilogram oil equivalent (EU) (measurement)
kV—Kilovolt (one thousand volts) (measurement)
kVA—One thousand volt Ampere (measurement)
kvar—one thousand vars (measurement)
kW—Kilowatt (one thousand watts) (measurement)
kWE—kilowatt electric (measurement)
kWh—Kilowatt hour (one thousand watt hours) (measurement)

L 
LaaR—Load acting as a resource (ERCOT category) (electricity)
LBA—Local Balancing Authority (electricity)
LBNL—Lawrence Berkeley National Laboratory (US)
LCOD—Levelized cost of delivery (electricity)
LCOE—Levelized cost of energy (electricity)
LCOS—Levelized cost of storage (electricity)
LDC—Local distribution company (electricity)
LED—Light Emitting Diode
LEVP—Low Emissions Vehicle Program
LHV—lower heating value
Li-Ion—Lithium Ion (electricity storage)
LIHEAP—Low Income Home Energy Assistance Program
LIPA—Long Island Power Authority (US) (electricity)
LLF—Load-loss factor (electricity)
LMP—Locational marginal price/pricing. See explanation in electricity markets.
LMR—Load Modifying Resource (electricity)
LNG—Liquified Natural Gas
LODF—Line Outage Distribution Factor (electricity)
LOLE—Loss of load expectation (electricity)
LOLP—Loss of load probability (electricity)
LPG—liquefied petroleum gas
LPN—Lender Participation Notes
LRG—liquefied refinery gases
LSE—Load serving entity
LSF—Load Shift Factor
lsfo—Low sulfur fuel oil
LWR—light water reactor

M 
MAAC—Mid Atlantic Area Council (US- geographically within PJM)
MADRI—Mid Atlantic Distributed Resources Initiative (US)
MAIN—Mid America Interconnected Network (US)
MAOP—Maximum allowable operating pressure
MAPP—Mid Continent Area Power Pool (US)
MBD—million barrels per day
MBOE—One million barrels of oil equivalent(EU)
MBR—Market based Rates
MBS—Macro economic Budget Support
Mcf—Roman numeral "M" for one thousand cubic feet (measurement of natural gas)
MDAS—Meter Data Acquisition System
MDD—Maximum Daily Delivery Obligations
MDDQ—Maximum Daily Delivery Quantity
MDM—Meter Data Management
MDQ—Maximum Daily Quantities
MECS—Manufacturing Energy Consumption Survey
MEDREG—Mediterranean Energy Regulators
MEDREP—Mediterranean Renewables Energy Partnership
MER—Maximum efficient rate
MERC—Mobile Emission Reduction Credit (MERC) (US)
MFV—Modified fixed variable rate
MISO—Midcontinent Independent System Operator, Inc. A regional transmission organization. (US)
MLP—Maximum lawful price
MLRA—Major Land Resource Areas
MM—Used to denote million in gas usage
MMbbl/d—one million barrels of oil per day
MMBtu—1 million British thermal units, same as dekatherm
MMC—Market Monitoring Center
MMCF—one million cubic feet (measurement of natural gas)
MMCFD—one million cubic feet per day
MMGAL—one million gallons
MMGAL/D—one million gallons per day
MMS—Minerals Management Service (US)
MMST—one million short tons
MODFLOW—model of groundwater flow
MOU—Memorandum of Understanding
MOX—mixed oxide fuel (nuclear)
MPAN - Meter Point Administration Number
MPG—Miles per gallon
MRO—Midwest Reliability Organization (US)
MSA—metropolitan statistical area
MSHA—Mine Safety and Health Administration (US)
msl—Mean sea level
MSW—Municipal solid waste
Mt—one million tons (ambiguous as to whether short tons or metric tons)
—one Metric ton
MTBE—methyl tertiary butyl ether
MTEF—Medium Term Expenditure Framework
MTEP—Midwest ISO Transmission Expansion Plan 2005 (US)
Mtoe—One million tons of oil equivalent(EU)
Muni—Municipality
MVA—Megavolt amperes (one million volt amperes)
MW—Megawatt (one million watts)
MWE—megawatt electric
MWh—Megawatt hour (one million watt hours)

N
NAAQS—National Ambient Air Quality Standards (US)
NAESB—North American Energy Standards Board (formerly GISB)
NAFTA—North American Free Trade Agreement
NAICS—North American Industry Classification System
NAP—National Renewable Energy Action Plan
NARUC—National Association of Regulatory Utility Commissioners (US) 
NAS—United States National Academy of Sciences
NASPI—North American Synchrophasor Initiative
NASUCA—National Association of Utility Consumer Advocates(US)
NATC—Non Recallable Available Transfer Capability
NBS—National Bureau of Standards (US)
NCD—Non coincidental Demand
NCEP—National Council on Electricity Policy (US) 
NCSL—National Conference of State Legislatures (US)
NEA—The National Energy Act of 1978 (US)
NEB—National Energy Board (Canada)
NEDRI—New England Distributed Resources Initiative (US)
NEM—Net energy metering (US)
NEPA—National Environmental Policy Act (US)
NEPOOL—New England Power Pool
NERC—North American Electric Reliability Council
NGA—Natural Gas Act (US)
NGAA—Natural Gasoline Association of America (US)
NGL—natural gas liquids
NGPA—Natural Gas Policy Act of 1978 (US)
NGPL—Natural gas plant liquids
NGPSA—Natural Gas Pipeline Safety Act of 1968 (US)
NGSA—Natural Gas Supply Association (US)
NGV—Natural gas vehicle
NHPA—National Historic Preservation Act (US)
NIETC—National Interest Electric Transmission Corridor (US)
NITC—Normal Incremental Transfer Capability
NIMBY—Not in my backyard regarding siting of energy generation and transmission infrastructure.
NOAA—National Oceanic and Atmospheric Administration (US)
NOC—National Oil Company
NOI—Notice of Intent or Notice of Inquiry or Notice of Investigation
NOPR—Notice of Proposed Rulemaking (US)
NORDEL—association of Nordic electric system operators, comprising Denmark, Finland, Norway, Sweden
NOx—nitrogen oxides
NPCC—Northeast Power Coordinating Council (US)
NPV—Net Present Value
NRC—Nuclear Regulatory Commission (US)
NRCS—National Resource Conservation Service (US)
NRECA—National Association of Rural Electric Cooperatives (US)
NREL—National Renewable Energy Laboratory (US)
NREPA—National Resource and Environmental Protection Act (US)
NRI—National Rivers Inventory (US)
NRIS—Network Resource Interconnection Service (electricity)
NSA—Noise sensitive area
NTAC—Northwest Transmission Assessment Committee (US)
NUG—Non Utility Generator
NURE—national uranium resource evaluation (US)
NYDER—New York Department of Environmental Resources
NYISO—New York Independent System Operator, Inc. (US)
NYMEX—New York Mercantile Exchange
NYPSC—New York Public Service Commission
NYSERDA—New York State Energy Research and Development Authority

O 
O&M—Operation and Maintenance Expenses
O3—Ozone
OASIS—Open Access Same-Time Information System
OATI-Open Access Technology International (US energy software company)
OATT—Open Access Transmission Tariff (US)
OCS—Outer Continental Shelf (oil and wind resources)
OCSLA—Outer Continental Shelf Lands Act (oil)
OECD—Organisation for Economic Co-operation and Development
OEM—original equipment manufacturers
OFO—Operational Flow Order
OMP—Operation and Maintenance Plan
Ontario—IESO Ontario Independent Electricity System Operator (Canada)
OPEC—Organization of Petroleum-Exporting Countries (oil)
OPRG—oxygenated fuels program reformulated gasoline (oil)
OREC-ocean resource energy credits
ORNL—Oak Ridge National Laboratory (U.S.) (nuclear)
OSHA—U.S. Department of Labor Occupational Safety and Health Administration
OTAG—Ozone Transport Assessment Group
OTDF—Outage Transfer Distribution Factor
OTEC—ocean thermal energy conversion (electricity)

P 
PA—Planning Authority
—Programmatic Agreement
PADD—Petroleum Administration for Defense Districts (US)
PBR
—pebble bed reactor (nuclear)
—performance based rates (electricity)
—Performance-based regulation
PCB—polychlorinated biphenyl
PCM—Project Cycle Management
PCS—Power conversion system, electric power conversion
PCT—Programmable Communicating Thermostat (electricity)
PD—Preliminary Determination
PDC—Phasor data concentrator. See description in phasor measurement unit article. (electricity)
PDCI—Pacific Direct Current Intertie (US) (electricity)
PERC—Passivated Emitter Rear Contact (type of PV cell)
PEM—Proton Exchange Membrane
PFC—perfluorocarbons
PG&E—Pacific Gas & Electric (US) (electricity)
PGA—Purchased gas adjustment
PHA—Production Handling Agreement
PHFFU—Plant held for future use
PIDX—Petroleum Industry Data Exchange (oil)
PIER—Public Interest Energy Research (CEC)
PIFUA—Powerplant and Industrial Fuel Use Act of 1978
PJM—PJM Interconnection, LLC, a regional transmission organization. (US) (electricity)
PLC—Power line communication (electricity)
PLMA—Peak Load Management Association (US) (electricity)
PM—Particulate matter
PM&E—Protection, mitigation and enhancement
PMA—Power Marketing Administration or Fed. Power Marketing Agency (US) (electricity)
PMU—Phasor measurement unit (electricity)
PNNL—Pacific Northwest National Laboratory (DOE) (US)
POD—Point of Delivery
PoE—Power over Ethernet
POLES—Prospective On Long Term Energy Systems
POLR—Provider of last resort (electricity)
PPA—Power Purchase Agreement (electricity)
PPI—producer price index
ppmv—Parts Per Million by Volume
ppp—Purchasing power parity
PPR—Potential peak reduction
PREP—Pacific Regional Energy Programme
PRESSEA—Promotion of Renewable Energy Sources in South East Asia (PRESSEA)
Prim—Primary (electricity) nuclear, hydro, geothermal, wind, solar
PSC—Public Service Commission
PSD—Prevention of Significant Deterioration
PSE—Puget Sound Energy (US) (electricity)
PSoC—Partial State of Charge, operational mode of grid supporting batteries able to respond to both demand and excess production, see UltraBattery
PTDF—Power Transfer Distribution Factor (electricity)
PTP—Point to Point Transmission Service (electricity)
PUC—Public utilities commission (electricity)
PUD—Public utility district (electricity)
PUHCA—Public Utility Holding Company Act of 1935 (US) (electricity)
PURPA—Public Utility Regulatory Policies Act of 1978 (US) (electricity)
PV—photovoltaic (solar)
PVC—photovoltaic cell (solar)
PVC—polyvinyl chloride
PWR—pressurized water reactor (nuclear)
PX—Power exchange

Q 
QF—qualifying facility
QSE—Qualifying scheduling entity
QUAD—1015 Btu (a quadrillion in the short scale)

R 
R/P—Reserve on Production
—Reserves to Production
RAB—Regional Advisory Body (US)
RAC—Refiners' acquisition cost
RAP—Regulatory Assistance Project
RAR—Reasonable assured resources
RAS—Remedial Action Scheme
RATC—Recallable Available Transmission Capability
RBMK—Russian: Реактор Большой Мощности Канальный = "High Power Channel Type Reactor" (RU)
RBOB—reformulated gasoline blendstock for oxygenate blending
RC—Reliability Coordinator
RCIS—Reliability Coordinator Information System
RCRA—Resource Conservation and Recovery Act (US)
RDF—refuse derived fuel (electricity)
REA—Rural Electrification Administration (US)
REC—Renewable energy credit (US)
RECS—Residential Energy Consumption Survey (US)
REEEP—Renewable Energy and Energy Efficiency Partnership
RER—Renewable Energy Rider
RES—Renewable energy source
RET/EE—IAF Renewable Energy Technology & Energy Efficiency Investment Advisory Facility
RF—Radio frequency
RFA—Regulatory Flexibility Act (US)
RFC—ReliabilityFirst Corporation (US) (electricity)
RFG—reformulated gasoline (oil)
RFI—Request for Interchange
RFP—Request for proposals
RGGI—Regional Greenhouse Gas Initiative
RGS—Renewable Generating System
RM—Rulemaking
RMATS—Rocky Mountain Area Transmission Study (US) (electricity)
RMR—Reliability Must Run (electricity)
RMU—Removal Units
ROA—Return of Assets (finance)
ROE—Return of Equity (finance)
ROFR—Right of First Refusal (finance)
ROI—Return on Investment
ROW—Right of Way
RPM—Reliability Pricing Model. See explanation in electricity market#Deregulated market experience. (electricity)
RPS—Renewable Portfolio Standards (US)
RRO—Regional reliability organization (US)
RSE—Revenue Stream Estimate (finance)
RSE—relative standard error
RTBM—Real-Time Balancing Market (electricity)
RTEP—Regional transmission expansion plan
RTG—Regional Transmission Group (US)
RTO—Regional transmission organization (US)
RTP—Real time Pricing
RTU—Remote Terminal Unit
RUS—Rural Utilities Service
RVP—Reid vapor pressure

S 
SCADA—Supervisory control and data acquisition a remote control and telemetry system used to monitor and control the electrical system
SCE—Southern California Edison (US)
SCE&G—South Carolina Electric & Gas (US)
scf—Standard cubic foot
SCO—Stranded Cost Obligation (finance)
SCR—Special Case Resources (US- NYISO category)
SCR—Selective Catalytic Reduction
SDG&E—San Diego Gas & Electric (US)
SEA—Strategic Environmental Assessment
SEC—Securities and Exchange Commission (US)
SEER—seasonal energy efficiency ratio
SEFI—Sustainable Energy Finance Initiative
SEIA—Sustainable Energy Industry Association
Seams—Interconnections Seam Study
SEPA—Smart Energy Power Alliance
SERC—Southeastern Electric Reliability Council (US)
SF6—sulfur hexafluoride
SFC—Solid oxide fuel cell (transportation)
SFEIS—Supplemental Final Environmental Impact Statement (US)
SFV—Straight Fixed Variable
SGR—State game refuge (US)
SHPO—State Historic Preservation Office (US)
SI—International System of Units (Système international d'unités)
SIC—Standard Industrial Classification
SMES—Superconducting magnetic energy storage
SMPs—Special Marketing Programs
SNG—Synthetic Natural Gas or Substitute Natural Gas
SO2—Sulfur dioxide
SoC—State of charge of rechargeable battery
SoH—State of health of rechargeable battery
SOL—System Operating Limit
SPCC—Spill Prevention, Containment and Countermeasure Plan
SPM—Synchronized phasor measurement- a WAMS network with synchrophasor sensors (PMUs). (electricity)
SPP—Southwest Power Pool Inc., a regional transmission organization (US)
—Statewide Pricing Pilot (US-California)
—Small power producer (electricity)
SPR—Strategic Petroleum Reserve (US)
SPS—Special Protection System
SR—Speculative resources For example, regarding uranium deposits. (nuclear)
SRP—Salt River Agricultural Improvement & Power District (US) (electricity)
SSG—WI PWG Seams Steering Group of Western Interconnection PlanningWork Group (US) (electricity)
SSM—Synchronized system measurement-a WAMS with synchronous sensors in addition to PMUs. See Phasor networks.
STEP—Southwest Transmission Expansion Plan group (US) (electricity)
SVC—Static VAR compensator (electricity)
SVEC—Shenandoah Valley Electric Cooperative
SWAT—Southwest Area Transmission (US) (electricity)
SWU—Separative work unit

T 
TAME—Tertiary amyl methyl ether
TAPS—Trans-Alaska Pipeline System (natural gas)
TBA—tertiary butyl alcohol
TBL—transmission business line (electricity)
TBS—town border station
Tcf—Trillion cubic feet (measurement)
TCR—Transition cost recovery (mechanism)
TDU—Transmission Dependent Utility (electricity)
TEFRA—Tax Equity and Fiscal Responsibility Act of 1985
TEN—Trans-European Networks (electricity)
TLR—Transmission Line Loading Relief Procedures (electricity)
TO—Transmission owner (electricity)
toe—Ton of oil equivalent (EU)
TOP—transmission operator (electricity)
TOU—time of use (rate) (electricity)
Transco—transmission company (US) (electricity)
—Transcontinental Pipeline (US) (natural gas)
—National Transmission Corporation (Philippines)
TRM—Transmission reliability margin (electricity)
TSO—Transmission system operator) (electricity)
TSR—Transmission service request (electricity)
TTC—Total transfer capability (electricity)
TVA—Tennessee Valley Authority (US) (electricity)
TW—terawatt (one trillion watts) (measurement)
TWH—terawatt-hour (one trillion watt hours)
T&D—Transmission and distribution

U 
U.S.C.—United States Code
U3O8—triuranium octaoxide (nuclear)
UAE—United Arab Emirates (oil)
UCAP—Unforced Capacity (electricity)
UCTE—Union for the Coordination of the Transport of Electricity, the power transmission system of continental Europe
UF6—uranium hexafluoride (nuclear)
UFLS—Under frequency load shedding (electricity)
UHVAC—ultra-high-voltage alternating current (electricity)
UHVDC—ultra-high-voltage direct current (electricity)
ULCC—Ultra Large Crude Carrier (oil)
UMTRA—Uranium Mill Tailings Radiation Control Act of 1978 (US)
UNCCD—United Nations Convention to Combat Desertification
UNDESA—UN Department of Economic and Social Affairs
UNDP—United Nations Development Programme
UNDP—United Nations Development Programme
UNECE—United Nations Economic Commission for Europe
UNEP—United Nations Environment Programme
UNFCCC—United Nations Framework Convention on Climate Change
UO2—uranium dioxide (nuclear)
UO3—uranium trioxide (nuclear)
UO4—uranyl peroxide (nuclear)
UOX—uranium oxide (nuclear) 
URR—Ultimate Recoverable Resources
USBR—United States Bureau of Reclamation
USCE—United States Army Corps of Engineers
US DOE—United States Department of Energy
USGS—United States Geological Survey
UVLS—under voltage load shedding (electricity)

V 
V—Volt (measurement)
VA—Volt-ampere (measurement)
var—Volt-ampere reactive (measurement)
VAWT—vertical axis wind turbine (wind)
VIN—vehicle identification number (US) (transportation)
VLCC—very large crude carrier (oil)
VMT—vehicle miles traveled (transportation)
VOC—volatile organic compound
VPP—Variable peak pricing (electricity)
VSA—Voltage stability analysis

W 
W—Watt
WACOG—weighted average cost of gas
WAMS—Wide area measurement system, also Wide area monitoring system - see description in phasor measurement unit article. (electricity)
WCMC—World Conservation Monitoring Centre
WCRE—World Commission on Renewable Energy
WEA—World Energy Assessment
WEC—World Energy Council
WECC—Western Electricity Coordinating Council (US)
WEI—Western Electric Institute (US)
WEEA—World Energy Efficiency Organization
WH—watthour (measurement)
WHO—World Health Organization
WIRAB—Western Interconnection Regional Advisory Body (US)
WRI—World Resources Institute
WSCC—Western Systems Coordinating Council (US)
WSPP—Western Systems Power Pool (US)
WSSD—World Summit on Sustainable Development
WTG—Wind turbine generator (wind)
WTI—West Texas Intermediate (US)
WTP—Willingness to pay
WY—Water Year (measurement)

Appendix: Residential energy acronyms 
The following table lists a number of terms that are used in the United States for residential energy audits.

AFUE—annual fuel utilization efficiency
BTL—building tightness limit (building tightness)
CDH—cooling degree hours (climate)
CFL—compact fluorescent light
COP—coefficient of performance
CRI—color rendering index
EEM—Energy Efficient Mortgage
EER—energy efficiency ratio
EF—energy factor (clothes washers)
EIM—Energy Improvement Mortgage
ERV—energy-recovery ventilator
HDD—heating degree day
HHI—home heating index
HID—high-intensity discharge
HRV—heat-recovery ventilator
HSPF—heating seasonal performance factor
HVI—Home Ventilating Institute
IECC—International Energy Conservation Code
K-value—thermal conductance
Low-e—low emissivity
LEED—Leadership in Energy and Environmental Design, standard for Green Building design
MEF—modified energy factor (clothes washers)
MINHERS—Mortgage Industry National Home Energy Rating Systems Standards
MVG—minimum ventilation guideline (building tightness)
MVL—minimum ventilation level (building tightness)
NAECA—National Appliance Energy Conservation Act
ODS—oxygen depletion sensor
RESNET—Residential energy services network
R-value—thermal resistance
SC—shading coefficient (windows)
SEER—seasonal E efficiency ratio
SHGC—solar heat gain coefficient
SIR—savings-to-investment ratio (energy conservation investments)
SLA—Specific leakage area
SPB—Simple Payback (energy conservation investments)
SSE—steady-state efficiency
U-value—thermal transmittance (also called U-factor)
WF—water factor (clothes washers)

See also 

Acronym
Lists of abbreviations

References

Notes

Energy
Energy
Acronyms